Property Envy is an American talk show series that debuted on July 9, 2013, on Bravo after the second season premiere of Interior Therapy with Jeff Lewis.

Format
Stephen Collins will present some of the most exclusive and expensive houses in the country to the Jeff Lewis, Brandie Malay and Mary McDonald while they try to guess the listing price of the following house. Fredrik Eklund and Ryan Serhant are expected to be featured as guest panelists.

Episodes

References

2013 American television series debuts
2013 American television series endings
2010s American television talk shows
English-language television shows
Bravo (American TV network) original programming